Sistersville Historic District is a national historic district located at Sistersville, Tyler County, West Virginia. It encompasses 215 contributing buildings and one contributing structure that include the civic, commercial, and residential core of Sistersville. Most of the buildings in the district date from the late-19th and early-20th century in popular architectural styles, such as Greek Revival, Colonial Revival, and Late Victorian.  Notable buildings include the Russell Building or Daily Oil Review Office (1832), McCormick /Henderson House (1880-1884), St. Paul's Episcopal Church (1885), Main Street School (1896), Union National Bank Building, Henneghan-Daly Block (1896), and Riverside Mill (1852).  Also located in the district are the separately listed Sistersville City Hall (1897) and Wells Inn (1894).

It was listed on the National Register of Historic Places in 1975.

References

National Register of Historic Places in Tyler County, West Virginia
Historic districts in Tyler County, West Virginia
Colonial Revival architecture in West Virginia
Greek Revival architecture in West Virginia
Victorian architecture in West Virginia
Buildings and structures in Tyler County, West Virginia
Historic districts on the National Register of Historic Places in West Virginia